A webnovela or foronovela is a phenomenon in Latin American and European countries like Argentina, Brazil, Chile, Colombia, Czech Republic, Dominican Republic, Estonia, Mexico, Peru, Poland, Puerto Rico, Romania, Russia, Serbia, Slovakia, Spain, Uruguay and Venezuela among others. The term "webnovela", translated to English means "web novel". It is like a television soap opera with actors and soundtrack among other traits. Its base principally is fan fiction, where fans of a certain serial or soap opera (in Spanish telenovela) or certain actor or actress create a story based on them.

Characteristics
Usually, a webnovela contains one or more of the following traits:
 Its length varies from 40 to 60 chapters
 For the characters, they combine actors, singers and models.
 They use the slang of the country where the story is written.

Cyberseries
A variation of the webnovela is the cyberserie. The cyberserie are more like North American series. They have seasons, and are composed usually of Anglo-Saxon actors.

Electronic publishing